MV Chacon may refer to:

 , a historic fishing vessel in Chugiak Alaska
 , a ship lost at sea in 1937

Ship names